Alexander Allen (May 1842 – January 7, 1924) was an American politician in the state of Washington. He served in the Washington House of Representatives from 1889 to 1891.

References

Republican Party members of the Washington House of Representatives
1842 births
1924 deaths
Scottish emigrants to the United States